Rofi-Centret is an indoor sports arena in Ringkøbing, Denmark primarily used for handball. It can hold 1,100 spectators and is home to Ringkøbing Håndbold.

References 

www.rofi.dk

Handball venues in Denmark
Indoor arenas in Denmark